This is a list of public art in Stirling, Scotland, and includes works in the Stirling council area. This list applies only to works of public art on permanent display in an outdoor public space and does not, for example, include artworks in museums.

Abbey Craig

Bannockburn

Balmaha

Bridge of Allan

Doune

Dunblane

Sheriffmuir

Stirling

Stirling Castle

Strathblane

Thornhill

References

Stirling
Outdoor sculptures in Scotland
Statues in Scotland